Sachin Garg is an Indian bestselling novelist, a first generation entrepreneur, publisher and speaker, best known for his semi-autobiographical chronicles. He has authored bestsellers like Never Let Me Go, It's First Love, Just Like The Last One, I'm Not Twenty Four, I Have Been Nineteen For Five Years, Come on, inner peace, I don't have all day. His last book topped the Hindustan Times AC Neilsen charts within a week of its release in June 2013

His most recent work We Need A Revolution, released in February 2016, is stated to be a marked change from his previous college fiction romance genre of writing. At the New Delhi launch of the book, the author stated that, "This book is not only about the Jarawa tribe in The Andaman Islands, it also asks the question that whether a bunch of boys and girls, today's youth, can fight for a cause they believe in, and how far are they willing to go for it." As a part of his social entrepreneurship travel project, he has collaborated with NGOs like the Survival International to push the cause of the marginalized in India and to weave narratives around these issues in an engaging writing style which will reach out to his huge youth following across the country.

Described as an 'author worth checking out' MTV, 'a must read author' Red FM, 'a writer who will be enjoyed by all' Times of India, he continues to write stories which redefine genres in the Indian publishing industry.

Personal life 
Sachin Garg was born and brought up in New Delhi. He completed his schooling at the N. K. Bagrodia Public School, Rohini and went on to pursue electronics and communication engineering from the Delhi College of Engineering (now Delhi Technological University). He did his post graduation from Management Development Institute and also from IAE Paris. He started writing while he was still in college. In 2011, he quit his job at JSW Steel Ltd and co-founded Grapevine India Publishers Pvt. Ltd. with Durjoy Datta.

We need a Revolution,  when opposites meet-2017
Come On, Inner Peace: I Don't Have All Day!, 
Never Let Me Go..., 
I'm Not Twenty Four... I've Been Nineteen for Five Years..., 
It's First Love!: ...Just Like The Last One!,

References 

Living people
Indian male novelists
1986 births
Delhi Technological University alumni